Butmir is a neighborhood in Ilidža municipality in Bosnia and Herzegovina. Sarajevo International Airport, the main airport of Bosnia and Herzegovina is located in Butmir.

Horse races are held at Butmir.

Geography
The Butmir region is very rich in flint. A small stream passes through before connecting to the Željeznica river in central Ilidža.

Historical importance
Butmir is known for archaeological finds dating back to the neolithic period. The residents some 5,000 years ago formed a distinct group, which is today known as the Butmir Culture.

Climate

NATO Training Centre 
Butmir contains an important NATO base in this region. The Butmir Training Centre near Sarajevo is one of the 15 verified NATO training centres. The Butmir Training Centre was formed in April 2005 through partnership of 12 countries, including the United States.

See also

 Butmir culture
 Butmir Training Centre
 Sarajevo International Airport
Tunnel D-B, linking Butmir with Dobrinja during the Siege of Sarajevo.

References

Populated places in Ilidža